Mind and Madness in Ancient Greece: The Classical Roots of Modern Psychiatry is a medical book by Bennett Simon. It was published by Cornell University Press in 1978 and reprinted on August 31, 1980.

Bibliography
Mind and madness in ancient Greece: the classical roots of modern psychiatry Cornell University Press, 1980,

References

1978 non-fiction books
Books about mental health
History books about ancient Greece
History of psychiatry
Cornell University Press books